Hannes Volotinen (15 August 1911, in Ilomantsi – 20 May 1980) was a Finnish politician. He was a Member of the Parliament of Finland, representing the Finnish Rural Party (SMP) from 1970 to 1972 and the Finnish People's Unity Party (SKYP) from 1972 to 1975.

References

1911 births
1980 deaths
People from Ilomantsi
People from Kuopio Province (Grand Duchy of Finland)
Finnish Rural Party politicians
Finnish People's Unity Party politicians
Members of the Parliament of Finland (1970–72)
Members of the Parliament of Finland (1972–75)
Finnish military personnel of World War II